Internals usually refers to the internal parts of a machine, organism or other entity; or to the inner workings of a process.

More specifically, internals may refer to:
the internal organs
the gastrointestinal tract

See also
 Internal (disambiguation)